Open Hearing is a 1957–58 American news-related talk show, with John H. Secondari as the moderator. It was a 60-minute program that aired Sunday evenings from 5:00–6:00 p.m. on the ABC television network.

A previous version of Open Hearing had aired in 1954, moderated by John Daly.

References

External links

1950s American television news shows
1950s American television talk shows
1957 American television series debuts
1958 American television series endings
ABC News
Martin Luther King Jr.